"Suicide in the Trenches" is one of the many poems the English poet Siegfried Sassoon (1886–1967) composed in response to World War I, reflecting his own notable service in that especially bloody conflict. Sassoon was a brave and gallant upper-class officer who eventually opposed the war, but he never lost his admiration for the common soldiers who had to fight it. Sassoon felt contempt for the political leaders and civilian war hawks who, safe in their power and comfort, sent young men off to die in huge battles that seemed futile and pointless. It was first published 23 February 1918 in Cambridge Magazine, then in Sassoon's collection: Counter-Attack and Other Poems. The poem is written in iambic tetrameter and consists of twelve lines in three stanzas.

The poem exemplifies the sensibility of war poets in "avoid[ing] sentimentality and self-pity while describing the realities of war". It tells of the suicide of a young man sent off to war and attacks the "'smug-faced' crowds who greet the returning soldiers". This is one of the poems referenced when Copp states, "It was with poems like these that Sassoon, more than any other trench poet writing in English, brought home to an uninformed public the true reality of the ghastly nature of the war."

Cultural references

In 2009, Brian Blessed read the poem within the song "Army of the Damned", part of the album Beneath the Veiled Embrace by the band Pythia.

The English rock star Pete Doherty set this poem to music and performs it sometimes during live performances. He also recited it along with his partner Carl Barât during the 2004 NME Awards with his band The Libertines.

In Nathaniel Ian Miller's novel The Memoirs of Stockholm Sven, the main character believes the poem has the "subtlety of a broad-axe".

Notes

World War I poems
1918 poems
Poems by Siegfried Sassoon
Works about suicide